Seven More Minutes is the second studio album by American rock band The Rentals, released on April 13, 1999 and features numerous guests, including Petra Haden (of that dog.; also appeared on The Rentals' first studio album, Return of the Rentals), Donna Matthews (of Elastica), Miki Berenyi (of Lush), Tim Wheeler (of Ash), Kevin March, and Damon Albarn (of Blur).

The album reached number 23 on the Billboard Heatseeker Albums chart.

Theme
Seven More Minutes was written by Matt Sharp while in Barcelona, Spain. There is a constant theme on the album about a Spanish girl he met there:
"Getting By" mentions "a girl who lives off the coast of Spain"
"She Says It's Alright" mentions the line "she says it's alright that you don't speak the language"
"Barcelona," which is about the Spanish city and has the line "My sweet angel, Barcelona, hide me safely, give me shelter"
"Say Goodbye Forever", ("Your place is so much different than mine, It's so calm and peaceful") This song was written before Return of the Rentals.
"The Man with Two Brains" ("The Europeans say...")

Additionally, CD artwork is based on photographs taken in Barcelona. La Rambla appears on the CD sleeve and images of Montjuïc and El Raval in the booklet and cover.

Track listing

Album background
A well-known bootleg called Little Russell Street features many of the demos and early mixes of songs from this album, all original songs by Matt Sharp except "My Head Is in the Sun", co-written by Weezer lead singer Rivers Cuomo.  Two tracks, however, were salvaged from earlier Rentals releases:

 "The Cruise" (which features Miki Berenyi) is a reworking of the song "So Soon" (featuring Petra Haden), previously released as a b-side for the "Friends Of P" single. It was penned in honor of Timothy "Speed" Levitch's 1998 documentary film The Cruise. 
 "Barcelona" is a reworking of "California", the very first Rentals song.

Performers
Matt Sharp - Bass guitar, vocals
Rod Cervera - Guitar
Jim Richards - Moog synthesizer
Kevin March - Drums

Additional musicians
 Damon Albarn - vocals on "Big Daddy C."
 Petra Haden - vocals on various tracks. 
 Miki Berenyi - vocals on "The Cruise"
 Donna Matthews - vocals on "Must Be Wrong" and "Say Goodbye Forever"
 Maya Rudolph - vocals on "Barcelona" and "My Head Is in the Sun"
 Tim Wheeler - guitars on "Overlee" and "Hello, Hello"
 Danny Frankel - percussion on "Hello, Hello" 
 Sharon McConochie - main vocals on "The Man with Two Brains"

References

External links
 

1999 albums
The Rentals albums
Maverick Records albums